Pittenweem railway station served the village of Pittenweem, Fife, Scotland from 1863 to 1965 on the Fife Coast Railway.

History 
The station opened on 1 September 1863 by the Leven and East of Fife Railway. It closed to passengers on 1 January 1917 and reopened on 1 February 1919. It finally closed to both passengers and goods traffic on 6 September 1965.

References 

Disused railway stations in Fife
Former North British Railway stations
Railway stations in Great Britain opened in 1863
Railway stations in Great Britain closed in 1917
Railway stations in Great Britain opened in 1919
Railway stations in Great Britain closed in 1965
1863 establishments in Scotland
1965 disestablishments in Scotland
Beeching closures in Scotland